Latin American Antiquity is a professional journal published by the Society for American Archaeology, the largest organization of professional archaeologists of the Americas in the world. Published since 1990 as a sister journal to American Antiquity, it is considered the flagship professional journal of Latin American archaeology, focusing on the archaeology of cultures in Mexico, Central America, the Caribbean, and South America.
The journal includes articles in historical archaeology.

Archaeology journals
Pre-Columbian studies
Latin American studies
Mesoamerican studies journals
Publications established in 1990
Cambridge University Press academic journals